The Lazarus House is a historic house in Downtown Columbus, Ohio. It was built in 1886 for Frederick Lazarus Sr., president of the F&R Lazarus & Company, and was designed in the French Second Empire style. It has undergone numerous renovations since its construction, including for conversion into office space, into apartments, and back to predominantly single-family occupancy. The house is a contributing property of the East Town Street Historic District, on the National Register of Historic Places and Columbus Register of Historic Properties.

Attributes and history

The Second Empire-style house was built in 1886, and serves as an example for townhouses in the East Town Street Historic District, on the National Register of Historic Places. It was built for Frederick Lazarus Sr., president of the F&R Lazarus & Company and son of company founder Simon Lazarus.

The Lazarus family moved from the house to another nearby around 1906. Their new larger mansion, at Bryden Road and S. Ohio Avenue, stood from 1906 to 1924.

It was added to the district when created in 1976, and to the district under the Columbus Register of Historic Properties in 1982. By 1976, the house held the office of a medical doctor, Henry B. Lacey, and was well preserved, with a noteworthy mansard roof, gable dormers, and a heavy metal cornice. Some time before September 1979, Lacey sold the house to one of his students, Thomas Mallory, who used it for the offices of Joint Implant Surgeons Inc. and continued restoring the property. Beginning in 1982, the house was rehabilitated by the Bernstein Group, and renovated for office rental use.

The house underwent a renovation from around 2013 to 2014, following concerns the house might be demolished. The renovators were led by Jeff Darbee and Nancy Recchie, who live on the same street and work as consultants in historic preservation. The pair used historic tax credits to help fund the renovation. The project involved creating three luxury apartments, and restoring many original features, including a grand staircase and geometric wood flooring. The house was put on the market in 2020 with a list price of $890,000. A couple purchased the house that year and began planning a renovation in April 2021.

References

External links
 

Houses completed in 1886
Houses in Columbus, Ohio
Second Empire architecture in Ohio
National Register of Historic Places in Columbus, Ohio
Historic district contributing properties in Columbus, Ohio
Buildings in downtown Columbus, Ohio
Columbus Register properties